HKFA may refer to:

Hong Kong Film Award, an annual film awards ceremony in Hong Kong
Hong Kong Film Archive, located at 50 Lei King Road, Sai Wan Ho, Hong Kong
Hong Kong Football Association, the association football federation of Hong Kong, China